Saray-Jük (Сарай-Жүк) / Sarai-Dzhuk (Сарай-Джук), Saraichik or Kishi Saray (Кіші Сарай) in the Kazakh language, Saraychyq (Сарайчык) in modern Tatar, and Saray Maly literally "Little Sarai", to distinguish it from Old Sarai, was a medieval city on the border between Europe and Asia. It was located 50 km north Atyrau on the lower Ural River, near the modern village of Sarayshyq, Atyrau Region, Kazakhstan. The city lay on an important trade route between Europe and China and flourished between the 10th and 16th centuries.

History
Until recently it was believed that Saray-Jük was founded by Batu Khan, a khan (king) of Mongol Empire, but archaeological excavations suggest that the city could have been founded as early as the 10th or 11th century. By the 13th century Saray-Jük became an important trade center, and was one of the biggest cities of the Golden Horde (Golden Palace). The ruins of the suburb Aqtöbe, located near Atyrau were preserved until the 20th century. The city had a ceramic water-pipe and both metallurgy and pottery were also developed. Neighboring populations were agriculturist or fishermen.

The Moroccan traveller, Ibn Battuta, passed through the town in around 1333 on his way from New Sarai to Delhi. At the time the river was spanned by a bridge of boats. While in the town Ibn Battuta sold his horses and purchased camels to draw his wagons on the next stage of his journey to Konye-Urgench. Neighborhoods of the city were a popular resort among the Golden Horde's nobility.

After the disintegration of the Golden Horde in the 14th century the city fell into decay: in 1395 it was ruined by Timur, but it was rebuilt in the 1430s-1440s. It remained the main city of the Nogai Horde. Uncovered coins suggest that the city retained commercial significance throughout the 16th century. The Kazakh khan also had headquarters there later. In 1580 or 1581  it was ruined by "thief Cossacks"—that is, Cossacks uncontrolled by the Russian government.

Ruins
The remains of buildings, workshops and others are situated at the bank of Ural River, which is washing away the ruins. In 1999 a memorial complex was established on the site by Kazakhstani authorities.

Footnotes

References

External links

Populated places in Atyrau Region
Former populated places in Kazakhstan
Golden Horde